Somatochlora clavata is a species of dragonfly in the family Corduliidae. The species was described in 1913 by Dr. Kan Oguma based on specimens from Hokkaido. It has also been recorded in South Korea.

References

Corduliidae
Insects described in 1913